Jorge Guarnieri (born 23 May 1955) is an Argentine sports shooter. He competed in the men's trap event at the 2000 Summer Olympics in Sydney, Australia.

References

1955 births
Living people
Argentine male sport shooters
Olympic shooters of Argentina
Shooters at the 2000 Summer Olympics
Place of birth missing (living people)